William Walsh may refer to:

Politics and government

 Joe Walsh (Illinois politician) (born 1961), full name William Joseph Walsh, American politician
 William Walsh (Maryland politician) (1828–1892), U.S. congressman from Maryland
 William Walsh (MP for Guildford) (fl. 1417), English politician and landowner
 William Allen Walsh (1887–1940), Canadian Member of Parliament
 William C. Walsh (1890–1975), American judge in Maryland
 William D. Walsh (1924–2003), American politician
 William E. Walsh (Oregon politician) (1903–1975), member and president of the Oregon State Senate
 William E. Walsh (Wisconsin tailor) (1869–?), tailor and state legislator
 William F. Walsh (1912–2011), U.S. congressman from New York
 William Henry Walsh (1823–1888), Queensland squatter and politician
 William J. Walsh (politician) (1880–1948), Newfoundland politician
 William L. Walsh (1857–1938), Canadian lawyer and judge, Lieutenant Governor of Alberta
 William Walsh (MP for Worcestershire) (c. 1561–1622), English MP for Worcestershire

Religion
 William Walsh (archbishop of Dublin) (1841–1921), Roman Catholic bishop
 William Walsh (archbishop of Halifax) (1804–1858), Roman Catholic bishop
 William Walsh (bishop of Dover) (1836–1918), Bishop of Mauritius and later Bishop of Dover
 William Walsh (bishop of Meath) (c. 1512–1577), Irish Roman Catholic prelate
 William Walsh (bishop of Ossory, Ferns and Leighlin) (1820–1902), Anglican priest and author
 William Horatio Walsh, Anglican priest in Australia and England

Sports
 William Shawn Walsh (1955–2001), American ice hockey coach
 William Francis Walsh (polo) (1907–1992), British polo player
 William A. Walsh (1871–1967), American football player

Other
 William Walsh (academic) (1916–1996), Vice-Chancellor of the University of Leeds
 William Walsh (officer), Irish soldier and officer, fl. 1605–1616
 William Walsh (piper) (1859–after 1913), Irish piper
 William Walsh (poet) (1662–1708), English poet
 William B. Walsh (1920–1996), founder of Project HOPE
 William G. Walsh (1922–1945), United States Marine and Medal of Honor recipient
 W. H. Walsh (William Henry Walsh, 1913-1986), British philosopher and classicist
 William Thomas Walsh (1891–1949), American historian

See also
 Bill Walsh (disambiguation)
 Billy Walsh (disambiguation)
 Willie Walsh (disambiguation)
 W. S. Pakenham-Walsh (1868–1960), British missionary to China and writer
 William Welsh (disambiguation)